Distilleries in Canada are distillers of various alcoholic distilled beverages (spirits) such as whisky, rum, vodka, brandy, gin, etc. in the country of Canada.

History 
Canada's first recorded distillery was established in Quebec City in 1769. By the 1840s over 200 distilling licences had been registered in the country, and Canada was gaining recognition as a producer of high quality whisky.

Operating distilleries

Liquors produced 

The modern Canadian distilling industry produces a variety of spirits (e.g. whisky, rum, vodka, gin, liqueurs, spirit coolers, and basic ethyl alcohol), but Canada's primary reputation, domestically and internationally, remains for the production of Canadian whisky, a distinctive rye-flavoured, high quality whisky. The product is distilled from cereal grains (rye and corn primarily), aged in oak barrels for a minimum of three years, then bottled or sold in bulk. Canadian whisky captures one-quarter of the total Canadian spirits market and is the only Canadian distilled spirits product which is "appellation protected", meaning that by law it can only be produced in Canada.

See also
Alcoholic beverages in Canada
Canadian whisky
List of whisky brands#Canadian whisky

References 
1. Long Table Distillery, First Micro-Distillery in Vancouver, British Columbia, Canada.  longtabledistillery.com

Alcohol in Canada
Canada
Distilled drinks
Canadian cuisine-related lists